Michael T. "Spike" Brady (born December 1854 in Chicago) was an outfielder for the Chicago White Stockings (the predecessors to the Chicago Cubs) in the National Association in 1875.

Brady's major league experience consisted of exactly one game with the White Stockings on September 25, 1875. He had one hit (a triple) in four at-bats, scored a run, and had three errors in eight chances in center field.

Brady's date and place of death are unknown.

References

External links

1854 births
Chicago White Stockings players
Major League Baseball outfielders
Year of death missing
Baseball players from Chicago
19th-century baseball players